The 2011 Missouri Tigers football team represented the University of Missouri in the 2011 NCAA Division I FBS football season. The team was coached by Gary Pinkel, who returned for his 11th season, and played their home games at Faurot Field at Memorial Stadium. It was the Tigers' final season in the Big 12 Conference as they departed for the Southeastern Conference in 2012. They finished the season 8–5, 5–4 in Big 12 play to finish in fifth place. They were invited to the Independence Bowl where they defeated North Carolina 41–24.

The NCAA recognized Missouri's football program for ranking in the top 10% of the country for Academic Progress Rate for the 2011–12 academic year, MU's final year as members of the Big 12.

Recruits

Key Losses:
 QB Blaine Gabbert
 WR Forrest Shock
 TB Matt Davis
 QB Daryus Allen
 C  Tim Barnes
 OL Kirk Lakebrink
 OL LeeRoy Mitchell
 DE Aldon Smith
 S  Jarrell Harrison
 DL Bart Coslet
 LB Andrew Gachkar
 LB Jeff Gettys
 DB Munir Prince
 DB Carl Gettis
 DB Kevin Rutland
 DB Tony Buhr
 P Matt Grabner

QB Blaine Gabbert chose to forgo his senior year eligibility and enter the NFL draft in 2011.

Four days after Gabbert declared for the NFL draft, sophomore DE Aldon Smith also declared.

Sheldon Richardson, a 6' 4" defensive tackle originally from St. Louis, signed a Letter of Intent to play for the Tigers in 2011. He was ranked as the #1 DT prospect in the nation from many recruiting analysts, and a 5* rating (out of 5). He also was ranked as the #1 player at any position in the State of Missouri. He originally signed with Mizzou in February 2009, but had to go to junior college (College of the Sequoias, in Visalia, California) to improve his grades; played DT for them in the past two years. He was also rated the #3 junior college prospect by Rivals.com. He also can play offensive tight end as well as defensive tackle.

Michael Boddie, Gerrand Johnson, and Wesley Leftwich signed LOI prior to Feb. 3 and enrolled in classes this Spring semester. 'More Info'

All 17 recruits signed their National Letter of Intent during the National Signing Period (February 3, 2011 – April 1, 2011).

The recruits signed by February 2.

Fully one-half (9) of the 17 recruits are from Texas, and four were in Missouri; two of those four were from St. Louis. The Mizzou class consists of four offensive linemen, four defensive backs, three linebackers, two wide receivers, two defensive tackles, a defensive end, and a quarterback. Richardson is the only junior college transfer.

A capsule look at Mizzou's signees here.

Schedule

Roster

|}

Rankings

Game summaries

Miami (OH)

@ Arizona State

Western Illinois

@ Oklahoma

@ Kansas State

Iowa State

Oklahoma State

@ Texas A&M

@ Baylor

Texas

Texas Tech

vs. Kansas (in Kansas City)

vs. North Carolina (2011 AdvoCare V100 Independence Bowl)

References

Missouri
Missouri Tigers football seasons
Independence Bowl champion seasons
Missouri Tigers football